This page lists notable alumni and students of the University of California, Santa Barbara. Notable faculty members are in the article List of University of California, Santa Barbara faculty.

Awards, honors, and prize winners

Nobel laureates

Pulitzer Prize

Academy Awards

Emmy Awards

MacArthur Fellows 
The MacArthur Fellows Program is also known as the "MacArthur Fellowship" or "Genius Grant."

Academics 

 R.J.Q. Adams, Ph.D. 1972 –American historian and Patricia & Bookman Peters Professor of History at Texas A&M University
 Reza Aslan, Ph.D. 2009 – Iranian-American author, commentator and religious scholar; professor of creative writing at University of California, Riverside
 Wendy Berry Mendes, Ph.D. 2003 – social psychologist and former Miss California
 Denis Dutton, B.A. 1966, Ph.D. 1975 – professor, philosopher, and founder of Arts & Letters Daily
 Carol Folt, B.A. 1976, M.A. 1978 – Chancellor of the University of North Carolina at Chapel Hill
 James Kilgore, 1969 - Former Symbionese Liberation Army and professor at University of Illinois, Urbana-Champaign
 Jakob Lothe, M.A. 1976 – literary scholar and professor at the University of Oslo
 Neda Maghbouleh, M.A. 2008, Ph.D. 2012 – American-born Canadian sociologist, scholar, writer, author, and educator; the Canada Research Chair in Migration, Race, and Identity and associate professor of Sociology at the University of Toronto Mississauga.
 Heather McKillop, Ph.D. 1987 – Mayanist archaeologist and professor at Louisiana State University
 John D. Petersen, Ph.D. 1975 – former President of the University of Tennessee system
 Saba Soomekh, Ph.D. 2008 – religious author and visiting faculty at various universities
 Ronald Vale, B.A. 1980 - Professor, University of California, San Francisco, Howard Hughes Medical Institute Investigator, Executive Director, Janelia Research Campus, member of the National Academy of Sciences
 Hans J. Van Miegroet, Ph.D. 1988 – professor at Duke University
 Tim Vivian, Ph.D. 1985 – scholar of Early Christianity and Professor Emeritus of Religious Studies at California State University, Bakersfield
 Jon Whitmore, Ph.D. 1974 – current CEO of ACT, Inc., former President of San Jose State University and Texas Tech University
 Jay Alan Yim, B.A. 1980 – composer and associate professor at Northwestern University

Arts, entertainment, and literature 

 Steve Aoki, B.A. 2000 – electro house musician, record producer, and founder of Dim Mak Records
 Gregg Araki, B.A. 1982 – film director, producer, and screenwriter; winner of a Cannes Film Festival award
 Tobin Armbrust, B.A. – film producer, president of Worldwide Productions and Acquisitions for Exclusive Media
 Brandon Baker – actor, Johnny Tsunami
 Jack Bannon - actor, Art Donovan on Lou Grant.
 Roko Belic, attended – film director and producer; winner of Sundance Film Festival award
 Lo Bosworth, attended – reality television participant on Laguna Beach: The Real Orange County and The Hills
 Benjamin Bratt, B.F.A. 1986 – actor, Law & Order, Private Practice, Miss Congeniality
 Lisa Bruce, B.A. 1983 – film producer, The Theory of Everything
 Yau-Man Chan, M.S. 1977 – reality television participant on Survivor: Fiji and Survivor: Micronesia
 Kayte Christensen, B.A. 2002 – sports commentator and WNBA player
 Claudia Cowan, attended – television journalist for Fox News Channel
 Steve Czaban, B.S. 1990 – sports radio talk show host on Yahoo! Sports Radio and ESPN 980
 Beth Rudin DeWoody, B.A. – arts patron, collector, curator, philanthropist
 Mark di Suvero, attended – sculptor and National Medal of Arts recipient
 Crystal Egger, B.A. 2000 – meteorologist for NBC4 Los Angeles and The Weather Channel
 Josh Elliott, B.A. 1993 – television journalist, NBC Sports, Today, Good Morning America
 Macduff Everton, B.A. 1981, M.F.A. 1984 – photographer and author
 Harris Faulkner, B.A. – newscaster and television host for Fox News Channel
 Scott Frank, B.A. 1982 – screenwriter, Minority Report, Marley & Me, The Wolverine
 Morgan J. Freeman, B.A. 1992 – producer and director, Laguna Beach: The Real Orange County and Teen Mom
 Tom Fruin, B.A. 1996 – sculptor
 Marc Germain, B.A. 1989 – radio talk show host known as Mr. KFI or Mr. KABC
 Dana E. Glauberman, 1990 – film editor, Juno, Up in the Air, and No Strings Attached
 Toni Graphia, B.A. – television producer and writer
 Mary Heebner, B.A. 1973, M.F.A. 1977 – painter and artist
 Paige Hemmis, B.A. 1994 – television host, Extreme Makeover: Home Edition
 Don Hertzfeldt, B.A. 1998 – animator and producer, Rejected and Billy's Balloon
 Peter Horton — actor, thirtysomething
 Iration, attended or were attending USCB when founding band in 2004; multiple albums have topped Billboard Reggae charts
 Wayne Isham, attended – award-winning music video director, Enter Sandman, Livin' on a Prayer, Bye Bye Bye
 Jack Johnson, B.A. 1997 – four-time platinum singer-songwriter and musician, In Between Dreams and On and On
 Moshe Kasher, B.A. – standup comedian and actor
 Kazu Kibuishi, B.A. 2000 – graphic novelist, Flight and Copper
 Aja Naomi King, B.F.A. 2007 – actress, How to Get Away with Murder
 Ken Korach, B.A. 1975 – sports radio play-by-play announcer, Oakland Athletics
 Robby Krieger, attended – guitarist and songwriter, original member of The Doors
 John La Puma, B.A. 1978 – physician, chef, and New York Times bestselling author
 Jenna Lee, B.A. 2002 – newscaster and television host of Happening Now on Fox News Channel
 Christine Lehner, B.A. 1973 – author
 Harvey Levin, B.A. 1972 – founder and managing editor of TMZ
 Audra Lowe, B.A. 1993 – television host of The Broadway Channel and formerly The Better Show
 Enrique Martinez Celaya, M.F.A. 1994 – artist
 Lon McEachern, B.A. 1980 – television broadcaster, ESPN's World Series of Poker
 Chanel Miller, B.A. 2014 – author of Know My Name: A Memoir and Emily Doe of People v. Turner
 Joel A. Miller, B.A. 1998 – author of Memoir of a Roadie
 Mary Miss, B.A. 1966 – environmental artist
 Richard Munson – author
 Jeff Nathanson, attended – screenwriter, for Indiana Jones and the Kingdom of the Crystal Skull and Catch Me If You Can
 Nekrogoblikon – metal band formed as live act by UCSB students in 2006
 Julie Nimoy, producer and director, Remembering Leonard Nimoy
 Benito Pastoriza Iyodo, M.A. 1981 - author
 Cathy Podewell – actress, portrayed Cally Harper Ewing on Dallas
 Joshua L. Pomer, B.A. 1998 – filmmaker
 Rebelution – reggae rock band formed in Isla Vista composed of four UCSB graduates
 Philipp Richardsen, D.M.A. 2007 – Austrian classical pianist
 Jim Rome, B.A. 1987 – sports talk show host, The Jim Rome Show and Jim Rome Is Burning
 Barbara Rush, 1948 – Golden Globe-winning actress, Bigger Than Life, The Young Philadelphians, Robin and the 7 Hoods, Hombre, Peyton Place
 Robin Sax – legal analyst and commentator
 Andrew Schulz, B.A. 1995 – comedian, podcaster, television host (Schulz Saves America, The Brilliant Idiots, Guy Code)
 Richard Serra, B.A. 1961 – minimalist sculptor
 Brad Silberling, B.A. 1984 – film producer and director, Casper, Lemony Snicket's A Series of Unfortunate Events
 L. J. Smith, B.A. 1987 – New York Times bestselling author of The Vampire Diaries and The Secret Circle series
 Mark Andrew Smith, B.A. 2002 – comic book writer and graphic novelist
 Bahar Soomekh, B.A. 1997 – actress, Saw III
 Andrew Spence, M.F.A. 1971 – painter
 Andrea Sperling, B.A. 1990 – film producer
 Charissa Thompson, B.A. 2004 – television host, Fox Sports Live and Extra
 Fred Toye, B.A. – television director
 Jerry Trainor, B.F.A. – actor and comedian, iCarly
 Katy Tur, B.A. 2005 – television journalist, NBC News
 Leah Turner, attended – country music singer
 Patrick Vlaskovits, B.A., M.A. – New York Times bestselling author and entrepreneur
 Dasha Zhukova, B.A. 2004 – model and domestic partner to Roman Abramovich

Astronauts 
 Joseph M. Acaba, B.S. 1990 – participated with STS-119
 Leroy Chiao, M.S. 1985, Ph.D. 1987 – commander of Expedition 10 aboard International Space Station and participated with STS-65, STS-72, and STS-92
 José M. Hernández, M.S. 1986 – participated with STS-128

Athletics 

Eric Avila – plays for FC Dallas of the MLS
Shane Bieber - Major League Baseball pitcher for the Cleveland Indians, Cy Young Award in 2020.
Joe Cannon – 2002 and 2004 MLS Goalkeeper of the Year, goalkeeper for Vancouver Whitecaps, former member of U.S. National Team
Cori Close - women's basketball head coach, UCLA
Chris Cope – professional mixed martial artist, formerly competing for Strikeforce and the Ultimate Fighting Championship
Lynne Cox – long-distance open-water swimmer, writer and speaker.
Lucius Davis (born 1970) - basketball player 
Noah Davis (nicknamed Diesel; born 1997), baseball pitcher for the Colorado Rockies in MLB
Larry Dierker – 1969 and 1971 Major League Baseball All-Star pitcher and 1998 NL Manager of the Year for Houston Astros
Eric Fonoimoana – 2000 Olympic Games gold medalist in beach volleyball
Rob Friend – soccer striker for Borussia Mönchengladbach of the German Bundesliga and the Canadian National Team
Tom Gamboa—baseball coach and manager
Scott Garson—college basketball coach
Bill Geivett – senior vice president, Major League Baseball Operations, assistant GM for Colorado Rockies
 Max Heidegger (born 1997) - American-Israeli basketball player in the Israeli Basketball Premier League
Mario Hollands – pitcher for Philadelphia Phillies
Andy Iro – plays for Columbus Crew of the MLS
Carin Jennings – 1991 FIFA Women's World Cup and Golden Ball winner, 1996 Olympic Games gold medalist in soccer; National Soccer Hall of Fame (personal) and United States Olympic Hall of Fame (as 1996 Women's Soccer team) inductee
Orlando Johnson, pro basketball player for Baskonia of Euroleague and NBA's Sacramento Kings, Indiana Pacers, Phoenix Suns
Neil Jones – has featured for New Zealand National Team, assistant coach for UCSB
Alan Keely – plays in Ireland for Shelbourne F.C. of FAI eircom League of Ireland First Division
Dan Kennedy – plays for Club Deportivo Chivas USA of MLS
 Stuart Krohn (born 1962), professional rugby union player
Jason Lezak (born 1975) – four-time Olympic gold medalist and seven-time Olympic medalist swimmer in 2000, 2004, and 2008 Olympic Games
Tony Lochhead – soccer left back for Wellington Phoenix FC of Australian A-League and New Zealand National Team
Thiago Martins – soccer striker for FK Bodø/Glimt of the Norwegian Tippeligaen
Kevin McClatchy – co-owner of Major League Baseball's Pittsburgh Pirates franchise
David McGill – plays in Ireland for Shelbourne F.C. of the FAI eircom League of Ireland First Division
Tino Nuñez – plays for Real Salt Lake of MLS
James Nunnally (born 1990) - basketball player for Maccabi Tel Aviv of the Israeli Basketball Premier League and the Euroleague
Barbara Nwaba – 2015 American heptathlon champion
Chris Pontius – plays for D.C. United of MLS
Kyle Reynish – plays for Real Salt Lake of MLS
Todd Rogers – 2008 Olympic Games gold medalist in Beach Volleyball; 1997 AVP Rookie of the Year, 2004-2007 AVP Best Defensive Player, 2006 AVP MVP, 2007 AVP Champion
Tyler Rosenlund – has featured for Canadian National Team
Skip Schumaker – former MLB second baseman for Cincinnati Reds
Brian Shaw – three-time (2000, 2001, 2002) NBA champion point guard for Los Angeles Lakers, former head coach of Denver Nuggets
Ryan Spilborghs – former MLB center fielder for Colorado Rockies
Bobby Webster – NBA general manager
Alan Williams – two-time NCAA rebounding leader and current player for the Phoenix Suns
Craig Wilson – U.S. Olympic water polo goalie silver medalist in 1984 and 1988 Olympic Games; participant in 1992 Games
Michael Young – retired five-time (2004–2008) MLB All-Star shortstop for the Texas Rangers and 2006 MLB All Star Game MVP
Barry Zito – three-time (2002, 2003, 2006) MLB All-Star pitcher and 2002 American League Cy Young Award winner
Don Ford - former American basketball power forward in the NBA for the Los Angeles Lakers and Cleveland Cavaliers

Business leaders and entrepreneurs 
 Robert D. Arnott, B.S. 1977 – investor and writer, founder and CEO of Research Affiliates, LLC
 Josh Berman, B.A. 1991 – entrepreneur; co-founder and former Chief Operating Officer of Myspace.com
 Grady Booch, M.S. 1979 – software engineer; co-creator of the Unified Modeling Language; Fellow of ACM, IBM, and IEEE
 Tom Bruggere, B.A. 1968 – entrepreneur and founder of Mentor Graphics, former Chairman of the Board of Stamps.com
 Anders Dahlvig, M.A. 1982 – former CEO and President of IKEA
 Robert Duggan – CEO of Pharmacyclics Inc.
 Logan Green, B.A. 2006 – co-founder and CEO of Lyft and Zimride
 Jeffrey O. Henley, B.A. 1966 – current vice-chairman and former chairman of Oracle Corporation
 Blair Hull, B.A. 1965 – businessman, investor, and founder of Ketchum Trading, former founder of Hull Trading Company
 Ryan Kavanaugh, attended – film financier, founder and CEO of Relativity Media
 Karl F. Lopker, B.S. 1973 – current CEO of QAD Inc, co-founder of Deckers Outdoor Corporation
 Pamela Lopker, B.A. 1977 – founder and President of QAD Inc
 Richard Nanula, B.A. 1982 – former CFO of The Walt Disney Company and Amgen, former Chairman of Colony Capital and Miramax
 Priya Narasimhan, M.S. 1995, Ph.D. 1999 – founder and CEO of YinzCam, electrical & computer engineering professor at Carnegie Mellon University
 Marc Nathanson, M.A. 1969 – entrepreneur and philanthropist, former founder and CEO of Falcon Cable TV
 Doug Otto, B.A. 1973 – co-founder of Deckers Outdoor Corporation
 Yngve Slyngstad, M.A. – CEO of Norges Bank Investment Management
 Peter Sperling, B.A. – educator and businessman, Chairman of Apollo Group
 Nick Swinmurn, B.A. 1995 – founder and former CEO of Zappos
 Chade-Meng Tan, M.S. 2000 – software engineer, New York Times bestselling author, and employee number 107 for Google
 Kazuhiro Tsuga, M.S. 1986 – current President of Panasonic
 Brett White, B.A. 1984 – current Chairman & Chief Executive Office of Cushman & Wakefield and former CEO of CBRE Group
 Dave Asprey, B.S. - Founder of Bulletproof 360

Government, law, and public policy 
 Kwadwo Afari-Gyan, Ph.D. 1974 – Chairman of the Electoral Commission of Ghana
 John Avalos, B.A. 1988 – member of the San Francisco Board of Supervisors
 Paul Bardacke, B.A. 1966 – Attorney General of New Mexico
 Sam Blakeslee, Ph.D. 1989 – member of the California State Senate and California State Assembly
 Barbara Bodine, B.A. 1970 – U.S. ambassador to Yemen during the USS Cole bombing
 Barry Brucker, B.A. – Mayor of Beverly Hills, California
 Joan Buchanan, B.A. 1973 – member of the California State Assembly
 Lois Capps, M.A. 1990 – member of the United States House of Representatives
 Salud Carbajal, B.A. 1990 – member of the United States House of Representatives
 Tony Cardenas, B.A. 1986 – member of the United States House of Representatives
 Norris Cochran, B.A. 1993 – acting United States Secretary of Health and Human Services
 Delaine Eastin, M.A. 1971 – California State Superintendent of Public Instruction and member of the California State Assembly
 Valerie Baker Fairbank, B.A. 1971, M.A. 1972 – senior judge of the United States District Court for the Central District of California
 Raymond C. Fisher, B.A. 1961 – United States Associate Attorney General and senior judge of the United States Court of Appeals for the Ninth Circuit
 Jean Fuller, Ph.D. 1989 – minority leader and member of the California State Senate
 Ruth Ann Gaines, M.A. 1970 – member of the Iowa House of Representatives
 Marc Grossman, B.A. 1973 – Under Secretary of State for Political Affairs and United States Ambassador to Turkey
 Roger Hedgecock, 1968 – Mayor of San Diego and talk radio host
 Jared Huffman, B.A. 1986 – member of the United States House of Representatives
 Ken Khachigian, B.A. 1966 – political consultant and chief speechwriter for Ronald Reagan
 Betty Koed, B.A. 1983, M.A. 1991, Ph.D. 1999 – Historian of the United States Senate
 Robert J. Lagomarsino, B.A. 1950 – member of the United States House of Representatives
 Brian Maienschein, B.A. 1991 – member of the California State Assembly
 Edward L. Masry, attended – attorney of the Hinkley groundwater contamination case made famous by Erin Brockovich
 Dionicio Morales, attended – Latino civil rights leader
 Mariana Pfaelzer, B.A. 1949 – senior judge of the United States District Court for the Central District of California
 Richard W. Pollack, B.A. – associate justice of the Supreme Court of Hawaii
 Milan St. Protić, M.A. 1982, Ph.D. 1987 – Serbian ambassador to Switzerland and Federal Republic of Yugoslavian ambassador to the United States
 Austin Quinn-Davidson, B.A. 2001 – acting mayor of Anchorage, Alaska
 Nick Salazar, attended – member of the New Mexico House of Representatives
 Paul Seaton, attended – member of the Alaska House of Representatives
 Roslyn O. Silver, B.A. 1968 – senior judge of the United States District Court for the District of Arizona
 Matthew Steen – co-founder of Weather Underground
 Dave Uejio – Acting Director of the Consumer Financial Protection Bureau (CFPB)
 Knut Vollebaek – Norwegian diplomat and Ambassador to the US
 Das Williams, MESM 2005 – member of the California State Assembly
 Joseph C. Wilson – U.S. Ambassador to Gabon and São Tomé and Príncipe; Distinguished Alumnus Award recipient; husband of Valerie Plame Wilson, classified CIA operative whose identity was leaked to the press in 2003

Science

Other notable alumni

References 

 
Santa Barbara alumni